Architecture in Omaha, Nebraska, represents a range of cultural influences and social changes occurring from the late 19th century to present.

Background 
The area comprising modern-day North Omaha is home to a variety of important examples of popular turn-of-the-20th-century architecture, ranging from Thomas Rogers Kimball's Spanish Renaissance Revival-style St. Cecilia Cathedral at 701 N. 40th Street to the Prairie School style of St. John's A.M.E. Church designed by Frederick S. Stott at 2402 N. 22nd Street. A young African American architect under Kimball's guidance was Clarence W. Wigington, who designed the Broomfield Rowhouse and Zion Baptist Church. Wigington moved to St. Paul, Minnesota where he became the city's senior municipal architect. In that capacity he designed hundreds of important civic buildings throughout that city, leaving an indelible mark on architecture across the Midwestern United States. The firm of Mendelssohn, Fisher and Lawrie was very influential in early Omaha, designing dozens of significant buildings throughout the city.

Notable figures in the history of Omaha architecture include John Latenser, Sr., a Liechtenstein-born immigrant; Byron Reed and A.J. Poppleton, early real estate moguls in the city; and Thomas Rogers Kimball and his student Clarence W. Wigington. Other early architects in the city included Charles F. Beindorf, who designed the old City Hall; Frederick W. Clarke, who designed Vinton School; and Jacob Nachtigall;

Public works

Commercial enterprises

Private residences

Religious institutions
There are several notable Christian churches in North Omaha. They include Calvin Memorial Presbyterian Church, located at 3105 North 24th Street. Formerly known at North Presbyterian Church, the City of Omaha reports, "Calvin Memorial Presbyterian Church is architecturally significant to Omaha as a fine example of the Neo-Classical Revival Style of architecture, taking formal inspiration from several buildings of the 1898 Trans-Mississippi and International Exposition that had been held nearby."

Holy Family Church was built at the intersections of 18th and Izard Streets in 1883 for North Omaha's Irish immigrants. Over the years it served Czech and Italian immigrants, and today is targeted at the city's African American Catholics. The building is listed on the National Register of Historic Places, along with St. John's African Methodist Episcopal Church.

Formed in 1880, St. John's was built in 1921 in the Prairie style. An auditorium extension was added to the building in 1947, and auxiliary rooms were finished in 1956. Designed by Omaha architect Frederick S. Stott, the building reflects a progressive attitude on the part of this black congregation at a time when traditional values in religious architecture were prevalent.

Notable architects

Notable former structures

See also
History of North Omaha, Nebraska
Landmarks in North Omaha, Nebraska

References

Further reading
 Gerber, K. and Spencer, J.S. (2003) Building for the Ages: Omaha's architectural landmarks. Landmarks, Inc.
 Landmarks Heritage Preservation Commission. (1984) Patterns on the Landscape, Heritage Conservation in North Omaha. City of Omaha Planning Department.